Alto Río Senguer Airport  is a public use airport serving the town of Alto Río Senguer, Chubut, Argentina.

See also
List of airports in Argentina

References

External links 
 Airport record for Alto Río Senguer Airport at Landings.com

Airports in Chubut Province